Friend is a surname. Notable people with the surname include:
Matthew Friend (born 1969)
Top Roll Grinder Port Talbot
 Andy Friend (born 1969), Australian rugby union coach
 Bob Friend (1930–2019), American Major League baseball player
 Bob Friend (newscaster) (1938–2008), British newscaster
 Charlotte Friend (1921–1987), American virologist
 Clayton Friend (born 1964), New Zealand professional rugby league player
 Cliff Friend (1893–1974), American songwriter and pianist
 Danny Friend (1873–1942), American Major League baseball player
 Donald Friend (1915–1989), Australian artist, writer and diarist
 George Friend (born 1987), English footballer
 George Friend (parliamentary official) (1835–1898), 3rd Clerk of the New Zealand House of Representatives
 Harold Friend (1902–?), English footballer
 Hugo Friend (1882–1966), American athlete
 Jacob Elias Friend (1857–1912), American state legislator, lawyer and businessman
 Jake Friend (born 1990), Australian rugby league player
 John Friend (disambiguation), multiple people
 John Albert Newton Friend (1881–1966), British chemist
 Kevin Friend (born 1971), British football referee
 Lonn Friend (born 1956), American journalist and author
 Lovick Friend (1856–1944), British Army major general
 Natasha Friend (born 1972), American author
 Nathan Friend (born 1981), Australian rugby league footballer
 Oscar J. Friend (1897–1963), American pulp-fiction author
 Owen Friend (1927–2007), American Major League Baseball player
 Patricia A. Friend, International President of the Association of Flight Attendants
 Peter Friend (disambiguation), multiple people
 Phyllis Friend (1922–2013), British nurse
 Public Universal Friend (1752–1819), American preacher
 Quinton Friend (born 1982), South African cricketer
 Rachel Friend (born 1970), Australian actress
 Richard Friend (born 1953), British physicist
 Rob Friend (born 1981), Canadian soccer player
 Robert Friend (poet) (1913–1998), American poet
 Robert Friend (pilot) (1920–2019), Tuskegee airman
 Rupert Friend (born 1981), English actor
 Simon Friend (born 1967), English singer-songwriter
 Tad Friend (born 1962), American journalist
 Theodore Friend (born 1931), American academic
 Travis Friend (born 1981), Zimbabwean international cricketer
 William Benedict Friend (1931–2015), Roman Catholic Bishop of the Diocese of Shreveport, Louisiana

See also
Friends (disambiguation)